The Decorations of the Romanian Royal House are a reward for conspicuous and special merits of the recipients for the Romanian state and the Romanian Royal House.

After the Fundamental Rules of the Royal House of Romania were signed in 2007, former King Michael I, who abdicated in 1947 under communist pressure, reinstituted the Order of Carol I and the Order of the Crown, and he also instituted three decorations and two medals.

The orders, decorations and medals currently awarded are:

 The Order of Carol I
 The Order of the Crown
 The decorations and medals listed below

Royal Decoration of the Custodian of the Romanian Crown

The Royal Decoration of the Custodian of the Romanian Crown is a Royal Decoration of the House of Romania instituted on 18 January 2015 by Crown Princess Margareta of Romania to symbolise a quarter of a century since her arrival to Romania after a 42-year exile of the Romanian royal family.

The Decoration
The Decoration is honoured to Members of the House of Romania and also both men and women for participating and making possible the return of the members of the Romanian royal family and also for promoting the royal family to people in their work of the restoration of Romania after the years of suffering of the Romanian people.

The Decoration may be awarded to current and former ambassadors or foreign Romanians who have brought an undeniable contribution to Romania's relations with the world.

The Decoration may be awarded to institutions or organisations, whose work is circumscribed for the above criteria.

Statutes
The maximum number of Members of the Decoration is 400, this also includes institutions and organisations.

The Decoration is celebrated on 3 May every year, which is the birthday of Queen Helen, Queen Mother of Romania born in 1898, the mother of King Michael I.

The Sovereign and Grand Master Knights both receive their version of the Decoration which is either a Medal or a bow formed Medal.
Male recipients are Knights of the Decoration and receive a Medal which can be worn on special occasions with a dark suit, tuxedo or tails.
Female recipients from the House of Romania are also Knights of the Decoration, other females are Dames of the Decoration; both receive a Medal and a bow formed Medal, during the day the Medal is worn with day dresses and during the evening either the Medal or bow formed Medal can be worn with an evening gown.

Characteristics
The Special Class Knights Decoration is crafted in White Gold which is of an oval shape and consists of 25 Sapphires and at the top with the Crown of Romania which hangs from the ribbon.

The Knight/Dame 1st Class' Decoration is crafted in Gold and is smaller than that of the Sovereign and Grand Master Knights' and at the top is the Crown of Romania which hangs from the ribbon.

The Knight/Dame 2nd Class' Decoration is crafted in White Gold and is the same size of the 1st Class Decoration and at the top with the Crown of Romania which hangs from the ribbon.

On the obverse of all classes of the Decoration is the effigy of Crown Princess Margareta, with the circular inscription "Custodian of the Romanian Crown".

On the reverse of all classes of the Decoration is the royal monogram of Crown Princess Margareta.

The Ribbon for the Medal and bow formed Medal is Dark Blue with Silver stripes on the sides which is the same as the Order of the Crown; for the bow formed Medal the ribbon is landscape.

Recipients

Special Class
 Her Majesty Margareta

First Class
 Princess Elena
 Princess Irina
 Princess Sophie
 Princess Marie
 Nicholas de Roumanie Medforth-Mills

Second Class
 Florin Iacobescu, Legal representative of the House of Romania
 Crown Princess Margareta Secondary School
 Countess Susannah Antamoro de Céspedes, Representative leader of FPMR
 Jean Milligan David, Representative of FPMR in Switzerland
 Alexandra Dăriescu, Acclaimed Romania Pianist
 Shajjad Rizvi, MBE (2021).

Royal Decoration of Nihil Sine Deo

The Royal Decoration of Nihil Sine Deo is a Royal Decoration of the House of Romania instituted on 30 December 2009 by former King Michael I of Romania; It is a symbol of durability, continuity, tradition and historical legitimacy of the Royal House, also to faithfully observe the distinctions created by the founder of the modern Romanian Royal House and the State, King Carol I.

The Decoration
The Decoration is honoured to Members of the House of Romania and also both men and women for working in the Social, scientific, educational, cultural, spiritual, economic, political and military fields; For: outstanding work, a respectable number of years in the profession, a high performance level, an extraordinary initiative, have shown generosity and a sense of responsibility.

The Decoration may be awarded to current and former ambassadors or foreign Romanians who have brought an undeniable contribution to Romania's relations with the world.

The Decoration may be awarded to institutions or organisations, if their work is consistently circumscribed for the above criteria.

Statutes
The maximum number of Members of the Decoration is 200, this also includes institutions and organisations.

The Decoration is celebrated on 20 April every year, which is the birthday of King Carol I of Romania born in 1839 and also the day he was elected Ruler of the United Principalities in 1866.

Male recipients are Knights of the Decoration and receive a Medal which can be worn on special occasions with a dark suit, tuxedo or tails.
Female recipients are also Knights of the Decoration; females who receive the Decoration from the works of their spouse, are made Dames of the Decoration; both receive a Medal and a bow formed Medal, during the day the Medal is worn with day dresses and during the evening either the Medal or bow formed Medal can be worn with an evening gown.
Organisation recipients are called Members of the Decoration and receive the Medal which is placed in the location of the organisation; the highest official would represent the organisation at events.

Characteristics
The Decoration is crafted in bronze and white enamel which consists of an oval with a length of 45mm and at the top with the Crown of Romania which hangs from the ribbon.

On the obverse is the effigy of King Carol I, with the circular inscription "KING CAROL I OF ROMANIA", framed with a border of white enamel that appears below the circular inscription "NIHIL SINE DEO".

On the reverse is the royal coat of arms of Romania with the inscription "1866–2010 ". When, in the years ahead will beat a new series of decorations, they will be labeled with the year after "1866".

The Ribbon for the Medal and bow formed Medal is Red with two yellow-gold thin stripes on the sides and a blue strip with white outlined by black in the middle, for the bow formed Medal the ribbon is landscape.

Recipients

2010
 Alexander Nixon, Chancellor of the Decoration and Member of the Romanian Crown Council
 Nicholas de Roumanie Medforth-Mills
 Elizabeth Edholm Fernstrom
 Constanta Iorga
 Moshe Idel, Acclaimed Professor at the Hebrew University of Jerusalem
 Iolanda Balaș, Romanian athlete
 Ivan Patzaichin, Romanian Sprint canoer
 Cristian Topescu, Romanian Sports commentator

2011
 Dinu C. Giurescu, Romanian Politician
 Andrew Popper, Member of the Romanian Crown Council
 Simina Mezincescu, Head of Protocol of the House of Romania
 Virgil Nemoianu, Romanian Philosopher of Culture and Essayist
 Adrian Vasiliu
 Mihnea Constantinescu, Special envoy of the Romanian Ministry of Foreign Affairs
 Alma Redlinger, Romanian Artist and Illustrator
 Valentin Gheorghiu, Romanian Composer
 Dr. Jonathan Eyal, International Director of the Royal United Services Institute
 Dr. Solomon Marcus, Acclaimed Maths Emeritus Professor of the University of Bucharest
 Mircea Martin, Romanian Essayist, Theorist and Professor of the University of Bucharest
 Virginia Zeani, Romanian Soprano
 Victor Ciorbea, 83rd Former Prime Minister of Romania
 Archbishop Francisc-Javier Lozano, Former Nuncio to Romania
 Ilie Năstase, Romanian Former World No. 1 professional tennis player
 Mihai Șora, Romanian Philosopher and Essayist
 Guy Pochelon, Member of the Romanian Crown Council

2012
 Nelly Miricioiu, Romanian Opera singer
 Ion Caramitru, Former Minister of Culture and Movie Actor
 Cristian Hera, Romanian Agronomist and Member of the Romanian Academy
 Călin Popescu-Tăriceanu, Former 88th Prime Minister of Romania
 Eugenia Moldoveanu, Romanian Soprano
 Maria Slatinaru Nistor, Romanian Opera Singer
 Marian Petre Miluț, Former 7th Romanian Christian Democratic National Peasants' Party
 Horia Andreescu, Romanian Composer
 Ana Blandiana, Romanian Poet
 Romulus Rusan, Romanian Writer
 Ionel Haiduc, Romanian Chemist and Member of the Romanian Academy
 Mugur Isărescu, 86th Prime Minister of Romania
 Angela Gheorghiu, Romanian Soprano
 Mariana Mihut, Romanian Actress
 Dana Deac

2013
 Michael Flaks
 Princess Anne de Ligne
 Victor Rebengiuc, Romanian actor
 Raed Arafat, Former Romanian Minister of Health
 Oliver, Marquis of Trazegnies
 Christian Badea, Romanian-American Opera and Symphonic Conductor
 Vladimir Zamfirescu, Romanian artist
 Gheorghe Hagi, Romanian footballer
 Dan Grigore, Romanian Classical Composer and Pianist
 Lucia Stanescu, Romanian Model and Soprano<ref>{{cite web|url=http://ziarulfaclia.ro/soprana-lucia-stanescu-onorata-cu-decoratia-regala-nihil-sine-deo/ |title=Soprana LUCIA STĂNESCU – onorată cu decoraţia regală "Nihil Sine Deo |publisher=ziarulfaclia.ro |date=2016-06-24 |accessdate=2016-06-28}}</ref>
 Radu Beligan, Romanian Actor
 National Academy of Physical Education and Sport
 University of Agronomic Sciences and Veterinary Medicine
 Bucharest Academy of Economic Studies
 Carmen Stanescu, Romanian Actress
 Olga Tudorache
 Bishop Nicolae Corneanu of Banat
 Stela Popescu, Romanian Actress
 Maia Morgenstern, Romanian Actress
 Lucian Pintilie, Romanian Film Director
 Institute for the Investigation of Communist Crimes in Romania
 Politehnica University of Bucharest
 Romanian Radio Broadcasting Company

2014

 AGERPRES
 David Esrig, Romanian Theatre Director
 Pascal Bentoiu, Romanian Modernist Composer
 University of Bucharest
 Ion Mincu University of Architecture and Urbanism
 National University of Music Bucharest
 Bucharest National University of Arts
 Pascal Bentoiu, Romanian Composer
 Andrei Andreicuţ, Archbishop of Cluj
 Dr. Dan Mircea Enescu
 Romanian Olympic and Sports Committee

2015
 Iași National Theatre
 National Theatre Bucharest
 Cluj-Napoca National Theatre
 Alexandru Ioan Cuza University
 Babeș-Bolyai University
 George Enescu Philharmonic Orchestra
 Valeria Seciu, Romanian Actress

Royal Decoration of the Cross of the Romanian Royal HouseThe Royal Decoration of the Cross of the Romanian Royal House is a Royal Decoration of the House of Romania instituted on 10 May 2008 by former King Michael I of Romania; It is awarded to those who have continuously supported the work or have contributed a significant deed to the Romanian Royal Family.

The Decoration
The Decoration is honoured to Members of the House of Romania and also both men and women working for the Royal House as collaborators who enjoy prestige in Romanian society, representing civil society, political or economic environment, world culture or diplomacy. The Decoration may also be honoured to personalities living in the country or abroad.

The members of the Decoration will be made personalities and hold important positions in the House of Romania.

The Decoration may be awarded to national or foreign institutions or organisations, which have contributed significantly to the promotion effort in the service of the Royal House of Romania.

Statutes
The maximum number of Members of the Decoration is 150, this also includes institutions and organisations.

The Decoration is celebrated on 26 March every year, the day Prince Carol I of the United Principalities became King Carol I of Romania, by vote of the representatives of the nation.

Male recipients are Knights of the Decoration and receive a Medal which can be worn on special occasions with a dark suit, tuxedo or tails. Female recipients from the House of Romania are also Knights of the Decoration, other females are Dames of the Decoration; both receive a Medal and a bow formed Medal, during the day the Medal is worn with day dresses and during the evening either the Medal or bow formed Medal can be worn with an evening gown.

Characteristics
The Decoration is crafted in solid Silver and Blue enamel, the Cross is of the same design featured on top of the Steel Crown, the Crown of Queen Elisabeta and the Crown of Queen Maria; above the cross is a small version of the Crown of Romania which hangs from the ribbon. The presentation of the bow formed medal is similar to that of the Order of Louise of the former German/Prussian Imperial and Royal Family.

On the obverse in the middle of the Cross is the monogram of King Michael I.

On the reverse in the middle of the Cross is the coat of arms of the House of Romania.

The Ribbon for the Medal and bow formed Medal is White with Blue stripes on the sides.

Crown Princess Margareta Medal
"Along with the Medal 'King Michael I to Loyalty', 'Cross Royal House of Romania' (Medalia Principesa Moștenitoare Margareta) and the royal decoration 'Nihil Sine Deo' Medal Crown Princess Margarita is a distinction created by the decision of the Head of the Royal Family of Romania."

King Michael I Medal for Loyalty
The King Michael I Medal for Loyalty (Medalia Regele Mihai I Pentru Loialitate'') "is given to deserving members or employees of the House of His Majesty over five years of the Royal House of Romania, all over the country and abroad. Medal may be offered also personalities from Romania and abroad."

Recipients
 Alexandru Muraru
 Patricia Klecanda, Director of FPMR in the US
 Corina Motts-Roberts, Secretary to King Michael I
 Mugurel Margarit-Enescu, Executive Director of FPMR

See also 
 House of Romania
 Romanian royal family
 Orders, decorations, and medals of Romania

References

External links
List of Recipients of the Decorations and Medals

House of Romania
Orders, decorations, and medals of Romania